Adama Coulibaly (born 10 September 1980) is a Malian former professional footballer who played as a defender.

Career
Having started his career at Djoliba, he spent most of his career at French sides Lens and Auxerre. He played one season for Valenciennes before he ended his career. He played international matches for Mali along with his cousin Moussa Coulibaly.

Honours
Lens
 UEFA Intertoto Cup: 2005

Mali U20
 FIFA World Youth Championship third place: 1999

References

External links
 
 
 
 

1980 births
Living people
Sportspeople from Bamako
Association football defenders
Malian footballers
Mali international footballers
Mali under-20 international footballers
2002 African Cup of Nations players
2004 African Cup of Nations players
2008 Africa Cup of Nations players
2013 Africa Cup of Nations players
Ligue 1 players
Ligue 2 players
Djoliba AC players
RC Lens players
AJ Auxerre players
Valenciennes FC players
Malian expatriate footballers
Malian expatriate sportspeople in France
Expatriate footballers in France
21st-century Malian people